Kyrgyzstan has submitted films to compete for the Academy Award for Best International Feature Film since 1999. The award is handed out annually by the United States Academy of Motion Picture Arts and Sciences to a feature-length motion picture produced outside the United States that contains primarily non-English dialogue.

Kyrgyzstan has submitted fourteen films for consideration since gaining its independence from the USSR in 1991, but has thus far failed to make it to the final stage of the final five Oscar nominees. The first-ever Kyrgyz film to be submitted for Oscar consideration was The Ferocious One, a Kyrgyz production that was submitted by the USSR in late 1974 to compete for the 1975 Foreign Oscar. In this Russian-language film, a boy convinces his cruel uncle to spare the life of a wolf pup and then raises the wild animal to keep watch over the house.

Submissions
Every year, each country is invited by the Academy of Motion Picture Arts and Sciences to submit its best film for the Academy Award for Best Foreign Language Film. The Foreign  Language Film Award Committee oversees the process and reviews all the submitted films. Following this, they vote via secret ballot to determine the five nominees for the award. Below is a list of the films that have been submitted by Kyrgyzstan for review by the Academy for the award since its conception.

The first five films are stories about life in rural Kyrgyzstan, and all were co-produced with funding from French production companies.

The first two films - Beshkempir, The Adopted Son and The Chimp - were written and directed by Aktan Abdykalykov (now known as Aktan Arym Kubat), and star his teenage son Mirlan Abdykalykov. Both films are coming-of-age dramas about life in the rural north of the country. Beshkempir is the story of a 13-year-old boy who finds out that he is adopted, while The Chimp is a grimmer story about a 17-year-old in Soviet-era Kyrgyzstan living in a poor, industrial town before being drafted into the Soviet army. The Light Thief, a comedy about a man who "steals" electricity from the national grid to provide to his poor village, was also written and directed by Abdykalykov, and features the director in his first leading role.

The Wedding Chest and Tengri (aka Heavens Blue) were culture clash dramas. In Wedding Chest, a young Kyrgyz man returns home from his studies in France, with a beautiful French fiancée in tow. His fiancée is warmly welcomed by the village and captivated by the beauty of the region, but the man stubbornly refuses to tell his family that the two are engaged. In Tengri, a Kazakh man runs away with a married Kyrgyz woman whose abusive muhajadeen husband has just returned from Afghanistan.

Beshkempir was the first movie from independent Kyrgyzstan to win awards at major international film festivals including Locarno and Tokyo. A Father's Will won the prize for Best First Film at the 2016 Montreal World Film Festival.

Beshkempir also became the first Kyrgyz movie to be released on DVD in the United States in 2000, while The Chimp and Tengri got an English-subtitled DVD release in Hong Kong. The Wedding Chest was released on DVD in Russia with no English subtitles.

Notes

References

Kyrgyzstan
Academy Award for Best Foreign Language Film
Lists of films by country of production
Academy Award